The following television stations broadcast on digital or analog channel 20 in Canada:

 CBLT-DT in Toronto, Ontario
 CFVS-DT-1 in Rouyn-Noranda, Quebec
 CHBC-DT-2 in Vernon, British Columbia
 CHNM-DT in Vancouver, British Columbia
 CIHF-TV-5 in Wolfville, Nova Scotia
 CJMT-DT-1 in London, Ontario
 CJMT-DT-2 in Ottawa, Ontario
 CKMI-DT in Quebec City, Quebec

20 TV stations in Canada